Mood Muzik 3: For Better or For Worse (originally titled Mood Muzik 3: It's About to Get Worse) is the 3rd installment in the Mood Muzik series by American rapper Joe Budden and DJ On Point.

Background
After almost two years of pushing back scheduled release dates, it was finally released on December 15, 2007. According to Allhiphop magazine, Joe Budden's latest offering is proof that the artist has not missed a step. Vibe Magazine called this mixtape "the sequel to the masterpiece", in reference to Mood Muzik 2: Can It Get Any Worse?. Shortly after the album's release, Budden released Mood Muzik 3.5, which is the same album without DJ tags, except for the exclusion of the Killa BH skits, and the inclusion of two new tracks—"4 Walls", which samples Eddie Holman's "Four Walls", and "Un4Given", which samples Metallica's "The Unforgiven". An official retail version—Mood Muzik 3: The Album—was released on February 26, 2008.

Critical reception

The mixtape received critical acclaim from all critics.

Track listing

References

External links
 Mood Muzik 3: The Worst Preview

2007 mixtape albums
Joe Budden albums
Sequel albums
Albums produced by Kanye West